Bishalgarh is a major town located in the Indian state of Tripura & a Municipal Council in Sipahijala district. As of 2001 census Bishalgarh has a population of 23,721. 12,248 people are male. 11,473 are female.

See also
 List of cities and towns in Tripura
Arunoday Saha

References

Villages in Sipahijala district